Mesapamea fractilinea, the broken-lined brocade, is a species of cutworm or dart moth in the family Noctuidae.

The MONA or Hodges number for Mesapamea fractilinea is 9406.

References

Further reading

External links

 

Noctuinae
Articles created by Qbugbot
Moths described in 1874